The 1959–60 Norwegian 1. Divisjon season was the 21st season of ice hockey in Norway. Eight teams participated in the league, and Valerenga Ishockey won the championship.

First round

Second round

Final round

Relegation round

External links 
 Norwegian Ice Hockey Federation

Nor
GET-ligaen seasons
1959 in Norwegian sport
1960 in Norwegian sport